Mehmed Pasha Bushati ( 1768–d. June 1775) was the Ottoman Albanian governor of the Pashalik of Scutari, between 1768 and June 1775. He was succeeded by his son Mustafa Pasha Bushati, and thus founded the hereditary Bushati family of Scutari.

History

Bushati was an Albanian Muslim clan leader.

In 1768, Mehmed Pasha became the governor of the pashalik of Scutari. In 1769 he fought in Zadrima. In 1770 he fought in Morea against Greeks and Russians, and in 1772 he and his son participated in the march on Ulcinj. He continued the Scutari pretensions over Montenegro and Brda, and planned to suppress their revolt; in early April 1774, he was in Podgorica and met with some chieftains of the northern Albanian tribes to discuss the planned operation. In 1774, in the same month of the death of Šćepan Mali, he attacked the Kuči and Bjelopavlići with 15,000 troops, but was decisively defeated and returned to Scutari. This campaign had a great impact on the Kuči tribe which was described as "destroyed".He died in June 1775, but this did not return the Sultan's rule to northern Albania; he was succeeded by his young son, Mahmud Pasha.

Annotations

References

Bibliography

18th-century people from the Ottoman Empire
18th-century Albanian people
Ottoman governors of Scutari
Mehmed
Year of birth missing
Albanian Pashas
1775 deaths